Jennifer Klemetsrud Puhl (born 1974) is an American lawyer who serves as an assistant United States attorney in the District of North Dakota and is a former nominee to be a United States circuit judge of the United States Court of Appeals for the Eighth Circuit.

Biography

Puhl received a Bachelor of Arts degree in 1997 from the University of North Dakota. She received a Juris Doctor cum laude in 2000 from the University of North Dakota School of Law. Puhl served as a law clerk to the Judge Mary Muehlen Maring of the North Dakota Supreme Court from 2000 to 2001.  From 2001 to 2002, she worked as an associate in the law firm of Kennedy & Graven, Chartered in its Minneapolis, Minnesota office.  In 2002, Puhl returned to North Dakota to join the criminal division of the United States Attorney's Office for the District of North Dakota, where she prosecutes a wide variety of criminal matters and serves in multiple roles including computer hacking and intellectual property coordinator, national security cyber specialist, human trafficking coordinator, and Project Safe Childhood coordinator.

Expired nomination to court of appeals

On January 28, 2016, President Barack Obama nominated Puhl to serve as a United States Circuit Judge of the United States Court of Appeals for the Eighth Circuit, to the seat vacated by Judge Kermit Edward Bye, who took senior status on April 22, 2015. On June 21, 2016 a hearing before the Senate Judiciary Committee was held on her nomination. On July 14, 2016 her nomination was reported out of committee by voice vote. Her nomination expired on January 3, 2017, with the end of the 114th Congress.

See also
 Barack Obama judicial appointment controversies

References

1974 births
Living people
20th-century American women lawyers
20th-century American lawyers
21st-century American women lawyers
21st-century American lawyers
Assistant United States Attorneys
People from Devils Lake, North Dakota
University of North Dakota alumni